Morar railway station is a railway station serving the village of Morar in the Highland region of Scotland. This station is on the West Highland Line, between Arisaig and Mallaig,  from the former Banavie Junction, near Fort William. ScotRail, who manage the station, operate all the services here.

History 
Morar station was opened on 1 April 1901 when the Mallaig Extension Railway opened.
The station was host to a LNER camping coach from 1936 to 1939. A camping coach was also positioned here by the Scottish Region from 1952 to 1959, the coach was replaced in 1960 by a Pullman camping coach which was joined by another Pullman in 1964 until all camping coaches in the region were withdrawn at the end of the 1969 season. These coaches were converted from a Pullman car, and were fitted with a full kitchen, two sleeping compartments and a room with two single beds.

Facilities 

The station has a small car park, a help point, cycle racks and some seats, and has step-free access. As there are no facilities to purchase tickets, passengers must buy one in advance, or from the guard on the train.

Passenger volume 

The statistics cover twelve month periods that start in April.

Services 
On weekdays and Saturdays, there are 4 trains in each direction to Mallaig and Fort William. Three of the four Fort William trains extend to Glasgow Queen Street. On Sundays, this decreases to three each way, with one eastbound train terminating at Fort William.

References

Bibliography

External links

 RAILSCOT on Mallaig Extension Railway

Lochaber
Railway stations in Highland (council area)
Former North British Railway stations
Railway stations in Great Britain opened in 1901
Railway stations served by ScotRail